Oziotelphusa populosa is a species of decapod in the family Gecarcinucidae.

References

Further reading

 

Gecarcinucidae
Articles created by Qbugbot
Crustaceans described in 2005